Cydia caryana, the hickory shuckworm moth, is a moth of the  family Tortricidae. It is found in North America.

The wingspan is 10–12 mm. Adults are on wing from June to July depending on the location.

The caterpillars (hickory shuckworms) feed on Carya ovata, Carya illinoensis and Juglans nigra.

External links
 Species info

Grapholitini
Moths described in 1856
Taxa named by Asa Fitch